Subrata Guha  (31 January 1946 – 5 November 2003) was an Indian cricketer who played in four Test matches between 1967 and 1969.

Guha was a medium-fast opening bowler. While he was a 20-year-old student at Calcutta University, he was largely responsible for inflicting the only defeat on the touring West Indians in 1966–67, when he took 4 for 64 and 7 for 49 for a combined Central and East Zones team. He was less successful on the subsequent tour of England, although he played in one of the Tests. He also had little success in three Tests against Australia in 1969–70. However, he continued to bowl successfully for Bengal in the Ranji Trophy, with 209 wickets at an average of 14.61, and best figures of 7 for 18 against Assam in 1972–73.

Guha worked for the State Bank of India. He and his wife Neelum married in 1971 and had two sons. One of their sons, Kunal, married the actress Nethra Raghuraman. Guha died suddenly of a heart attack in November 2003, aged 57.

References

External links
 

1946 births
2003 deaths
Cricketers from Kolkata
India Test cricketers
Indian cricketers
University of Calcutta alumni
East Zone cricketers
Bengal cricketers
Bengali Hindus
Indian Hindus
Indian Universities cricketers
State Bank of India cricketers